Daniel Rodrigo de Oliveira (born 14 September 1985) is a Brazilian footballer who plays as a forward for Belgian amateur side Lokeren-Temse.

Career
He initially played in his native Brazil before moving to Belgium where he spent the majority of his career playing in the  Belgian Second Division and Belgian Third Division before moving to Ukraine.

On June 20, 2013, he signed 1+2 years contract with FC Metalurh Donetsk.

Personal life
Oliveira is married, him and wife Milena have a son called Caua.

Career statistics
.

References

External links
 Official Metalurh Donetsk website profile (Rus)
 Official FFU website profile  (Ukr)

1985 births
Living people
Brazilian footballers
Brazilian expatriate footballers
Association football forwards
FC Metalurh Donetsk players
Ukrainian Premier League players
Expatriate footballers in Belgium
Brazilian expatriate sportspeople in Belgium
Expatriate footballers in Ukraine
Brazilian expatriate sportspeople in Ukraine
Place of birth missing (living people)
Guarani FC players
Sociedade Esportiva Palmeiras players
Associação Esportiva Araçatuba players
Associação Portuguesa de Desportos players
K. Rupel Boom F.C. players
RWS Bruxelles players
S.C. Eendracht Aalst players
K.M.S.K. Deinze players
Cercle Brugge K.S.V. players
Challenger Pro League players
Ettifaq FC players
Saudi First Division League players
Sportkring Sint-Niklaas players
Royal FC Mandel United players